Jamie MacDonald is an international lawn bowler from Jersey.

Bowls career
MacDonald represented Jersey at the 2014 Commonwealth Games in the triples and fours.

In 2007 he won the singles bronze medal at the Atlantic Bowls Championships.

References

Jersey bowls players
Living people
1987 births
Bowls players at the 2014 Commonwealth Games